Winnipeg—Fort Garry was a federal electoral district in Manitoba, Canada, that was represented in the House of Commons of Canada from 1979 to 1988. It consisted of the Fort Rouge and Fort Garry areas of Winnipeg. 

This riding was created in 1976 from all of the Winnipeg South riding, except River Heights, which was transferred to the Winnipeg—Assiniboine riding. It was contested at federal elections in 1979, 1980, and 1984. For its entire history, its Member of Parliament was Lloyd Axworthy.

Boundary redistribution in 1987 abolished Winnipeg—Fort Garry: Fort Garry was put in Winnipeg South and Fort Rouge in Winnipeg South Centre. Axworthy continued to represent Winnipeg South Centre from the 1988 federal election until he retired from Parliament in 2000.

Election results

See also
 List of Canadian electoral districts
 Historical federal electoral districts of Canada

External links

Former federal electoral districts of Manitoba
Fort Garry, Winnipeg